This is a list of 2013 events that occurred in Moldova.

Incumbents
President: Nicolae Timofti
Prime Minister: Vlad Filat (until 25 April), Iurie Leancă (starting 25 April)
President of the Parliament: Marian Lupu (until 25 April), Liliana Palihovici (25 April–30 May), Igor Corman (starting 30 May)

Events
Moldova in the Eurovision Song Contest 2013.

References

 
Years of the 21st century in Moldova
Moldova